Valentin Stanchev (born 25 October 1968) is a former Bulgarian footballer who played as a striker.

Career
Born in Vratsa, Valentin Stanchev played in his career for Botev Vratsa, Chernomorets Burgas, Spartak Varna, Shanghai Shenhua, CSKA Sofia,  Sachsen Leipzig and Cherno More Varna.

On 26 May 1999, Stanchev scored for the 1–0 win for CSKA in the final of Bulgarian Cup against Litex Lovech.

Honours

As a player 
 Shanghai Shenhua
 Chinese Jia-A League
 Runner-up (1): 1996–97

 CSKA Sofia
 Bulgarian Cup
 Winner (1): 1998–99

References

Living people
1968 births
Bulgarian footballers
Bulgaria international footballers
Bulgarian expatriate footballers
Bulgarian football managers
FC Botev Vratsa players
FC Chernomorets Burgas players
PFC Spartak Varna players
Shanghai Shenhua F.C. players
PFC CSKA Sofia players
FC Sachsen Leipzig players
PFC Cherno More Varna players
First Professional Football League (Bulgaria) players
Expatriate footballers in China
Expatriate footballers in Germany
Bulgarian expatriate sportspeople in China
Bulgarian expatriate sportspeople in Germany
Association football forwards
People from Vratsa